Merriam Lake is a lake situated in the Lost River Range in Idaho, surrounded by mountains over  high. In 2007 the state authorities planted tiger muskies in the lake to better manage the fisheries. Bighorn sheep and Mountain goat are the few mammals disposed to this terrain of central Idaho which Dr. C. Hart Merriam identified as Arctic–alpine when he made a biological survey of the region in 1890.

References

Lakes of Custer County, Idaho
Lakes of Idaho